The Turbomeca Aubisque was a small turbofan engine designed and produced by Turbomeca in the 1960s. Its only application was the Saab 105 military trainer aircraft as the RM9. The engine is named after the Col d'Aubisque in the Pyrenees mountains, in line with company tradition.

The earlier Turbomeca Marboré turbojet was originally intended for the Saab 105, but when Saab needed more thrust than the Marboré produced, Turbomeca offered the Aubisque turbofan, a turbofan version of the Turbomeca Bastan turboprop. The Aubisque went into production for the Saab 105 and about 300 were produced, remaining in service for 30 years until replaced in the mid-1990s, by the Williams FJ44 turbofan, for surviving Swedish Air Force Saab 105s.

Applications
 Saab 105

Specifications (Aubisque 1A)

See also

References

Further reading

 

Aubisque
Low-bypass turbofan engines
1960s turbofan engines
Centrifugal-flow turbojet engines